Francisc Cocoș (14 October 1910 – 1975) was a Romanian wrestler. He competed in the men's Greco-Roman middleweight at the 1936 Summer Olympics.

References

External links
 

1910 births
1975 deaths
Romanian male sport wrestlers
Olympic wrestlers of Romania
Wrestlers at the 1936 Summer Olympics
Sportspeople from Arad, Romania